is the 39th studio album by Japanese singer-songwriter Miyuki Nakajima, released in 2012.

Track listing
All songs written and composed by Miyuki Nakajima and arranged by Ichizo Seo.
""
""
"" – 3:09
""
""
"" 
""
""
"" 
"" – 5:55
""
""

Personnel
Miyuki Nakajima – Lead vocals

References

Miyuki Nakajima albums
2012 albums